Suffer, Survive is the third album from Canadian hardcore band No Warning released on Machine Shop Records. The album is the band's debut release on the Machine Shop label, and features an alternative rock sound with very melodic vocals, unlike the band's previous releases.

The album was produced by then Sum 41 manager/producer Greig Nori, and has a much more melodic hardcore feel to it, than any of the band's previous albums.

Videos were made for the singles "Bad Timing" and "Back to Life". The song "Breeding Insanity" was featured in the 2005 video game Need For Speed: Underground Rivals and NFL Street 2.

Track listing
 "Dirtier than the Next" - 1:57
 "Bad Timing" - 3:05
 "Modern Eyes" - 1:44
 "Scratch the Skin" - 3:22
 "Hopeless Case" - 2:32
 "Back to Life" - 2:46
 "No Don't Think So" - 3:11
 "Breeding Insanity" - 3:11
 "Live Through Me" (Bonus track) - 2:57
 "S304" (Bonus track) - 6:13

Personnel
Ben Cook - vocals
Matt Delong - guitar
Jordan Posner - guitar
Zach Amster - bass
Jesse Labovitz - drums

References

2004 albums
Albums produced by Greig Nori
No Warning (band) albums